Berglind may refer to:

 Berglind (given name), an Icelandic feminine given name
 Berglind (surname), a Swedish surname